Parvicincia is a genus of moths in the subfamily Arctiinae. It contains the single species Parvicincia belli, which is found on Jamaica.

References

Lithosiini